Yacouba Komara (born 8 January 1971) is an Ivorian footballer. He played in 12 matches for the Ivory Coast national football team from 1990 to 1999. He was also named in Ivory Coast's squad for the 1994 African Cup of Nations tournament.

References

1971 births
Living people
Ivorian footballers
Ivory Coast international footballers
1994 African Cup of Nations players
Place of birth missing (living people)
Association footballers not categorized by position